Tetsuya's is a restaurant in Sydney, Australia, owned and operated by chef Tetsuya Wakuda. Tetsuya's cuisine is based on Australian, Japanese and classic French cuisine, and makes use of Australian ingredients. The restaurant is known for its signature dish, the Confit of Tasmanian Ocean Trout, referred to by Financial Review as "the world's most photographed dish," and has been offered since 1987. Tetsuya's, along with the French establishment Claude's, is credited with bringing a new style of fine-dining cuisine to Sydney.

Location
In the late 1980s and 1990s, Tetsuya's was located in a terrace house in the typical style of the Sydney inner-western suburb of Rozelle. In 2000, Tetsuya's moved to the former Suntory building in the Centre of Sydney.

Style of cuisine
Tetsuya's serves a set ten course degustation menu. American chef Charlie Trotter said, "Tetsuya is part of an elite group of international chefs that has influenced other chefs through their personal styles and unique approaches to food. His culinary philosophy centres on pure, clean flavours that are decisive, yet completely refined. His amazing technique, Asian heritage, sincere humility, worldwide travels and insatiable curiosity combine to create incredible, soulful dishes that exude passion in every bite."

Influence
Several of Australia's top chefs have been trained at Tetsuya's, including Darren Robertson, Luke Powell, Martin Benn, and Dan Hong.

Awards 

Restaurant S.Pellegrino World's 50 Best Restaurants in 2004, 2005, 2006, 2007, 2008, 2009, 2010, 2011 and 2012.
Restaurant of the Year and Best Fine Dining at the Restaurant & Catering Association Awards 2005, 2006, 2007, 2008, 2009, 2010, 2011, 2012 and 2013. 
It was named The Sydney Morning Herald Good Food Guide's Restaurant of the Year for 2007.
The Sydney Morning Herald Good Food Guide awarded it the highest possible achievement every year from 1992 until 2009; in 2010 it dropped to two hats out of three.

References

External links 
 Official site
 Contact details and customer reviews

Asian-Australian culture in Sydney
Japanese-Australian culture
Japanese restaurants
Restaurants in Sydney
French restaurants
Australian cuisine
French-Australian culture
Asian restaurants in Australia
European restaurants in Australia